Alvin S. Felzenberg is an American author, columnist, consultant, educator, historian, public official, and spokesperson. A resident of Palm Beach, Florida and Washington, D.C., he served with the 9/11 Commission and has written books on American history and biography, with some of his best known being studies of the country's presidents, such as A Man and His Presidents: The Political Odyssey of William F. Buckley, Jr. and The Leaders We Deserved. He has been a professor at The University of Pennsylvania. He is a political conservative who considers Ronald Reagan a "great" president who "belongs on Mount Rushmore."

Background and career
Felzenberg was Principal Spokesman for the National Commission on Terrorist Attacks Upon the United States, also known as the 9/11 Commission. He subsequently served as Director of Communications for the Joint Economic Committee of the United States Congress.

Felzenberg served as the Special Assistant and Adviser to the National Broadcasting Board of Governors, as consultant to the Secretary of the Navy, and as Director of Community Outreach and Public Liaison for the Office of Secretary in the U.S. Department of Defense during the administration of George W. Bush. From 1982 to 1989, Felzenberg was assistant secretary of state of New Jersey in the administration of Governor Thomas H. Kean.

Felzenberg was a fellow at the Institute of Politics at the John F. Kennedy School of Government at Harvard University. He has lectured at Princeton, Yale, George Washington, and Johns Hopkins Universities. Since 2007, Felzenberg has been visiting lecturer at the Annenberg School for Communications at the University of Pennsylvania.

He is the author of The Keys to a Successful Presidency, Governor Tom Kean: From the New Jersey Statehouse to the 9/11 Commission, The Leaders We Deserved (and a Few We Didn't): Rethinking the Presidential Rating Game, and A Man and His Presidents: The Political Odyssey of William F. Buckley Jr. In January 2021, just before Donald Trump left the presidency, Felzenberg stated that an update of his evaluation of U.S. presidents would rank Trump among the worst ever.

Felzenberg is a regular contributor to several periodicals, including The Philadelphia Inquirer, U.S. News & World Report, The Weekly Standard and National Review.

Felzenberg holds a Ph.D. and an M.A. in politics from Princeton University and an M.A. and B.A. from Rutgers University.

He previously served on a senior staff member of the Government Affairs and Oversight Committee of the U.S. House of Representatives.

See also

 9/11 Commission
 The Leaders We Deserved

References

External links
 
 9/11 Public Discourse Project - Biography
 AlFelzenberg.com (Archived)

21st-century American essayists
21st-century American historians
American male non-fiction writers
Harvard Kennedy School faculty
Living people
Year of birth missing (living people)
Princeton University alumni
Rutgers University alumni
21st-century American male writers
National Review people